The Power of the Resurrection is a 1958 American feature film directed by Harold D. Schuster and starring Richard Kiley, Jon Shepodd, Morris Ankrum. The film is also known as The Passion and the Power of the Christ.

Plot
A young man soon facing the death sentence for his Christian faith shares his fears with Peter. Peter faces the same fate and tells the man about his own fear that he felt after Jesus was arrested in the garden of Gethsemane, when he had to deny his knowing of Jesus for three times. However, Jesus still told Peter that he would be the rock on which the Church would be built.

Cast
Richard Kiley as Peter
Jon Shepodd as Jesus Christ
Jan Arvan as Judas
Morris Ankrum as Annas
Robert Cornthwaite as Caiaphus
Stephen Joyce as John
Booth Colman as James
Dorothy Morris as Mary, Sister of Lazarus
Charles Maxwell as Investigator
Dan Riss as Thomas
John Zaremba as Samuel
Charles Wagenheim as Merchant
Gilman Rankin as Joseph of Arimathea

References

External links

1958 films
Films directed by Harold D. Schuster
Films scored by Paul Dunlap
1950s English-language films
American drama films
1950s American films